AI is a computer virus which infects executable files. The virus is loaded into memory by running an infected file and then modifies the computer's run time operation and corrupts program and overlay files. It doesn't seem to work with all executables but does reliably infect standard DOS files. AI adds useless bytes to the end of infected files

References

External links 
Computer Viruses (A), by Probert Encyclopedia
AI, by Symantec

DOS file viruses